Three Arabian Nuts is a 1951 short subject directed by Edward Bernds starring American slapstick comedy team The Three Stooges (Moe Howard, Larry Fine and Shemp Howard). It is the 129th entry in the series released by Columbia Pictures starring the comedians, who released 190 shorts for the studio between 1934 and 1959.

Plot
The Stooges are warehouse workers at the Superior Warehouse and Storage Company assigned to delivering some Arabian antique for client Mr. Bradley (Vernon Dent). While unpacking the goods at Mr. Bradley's house, Shemp stumbles upon a magic lamp that he, at first, dubs a "syrup pitcher." After giving the lamp a cleaning, a djinni appears (Wesley Bly), startling Shemp. Calling the djinni "genius," the Stooges are pursued by two Arabian thugs (Philip Van Zandt, Dick Curtis) who are after the magic lamp. Mr. Bradley is unaware of the magic lamp, which he gives to Shemp. Only Shemp and Larry know about the magic of the lamp, in which Moe doubts. The thugs are apprehended, thanks to the genius, and at the end, the stooges are seen with their girls plus the million dollars that are now shared by the stooges. They all depart for a traveling vacation, leaving Mr. Bradley, who uses a mallet to repeatedly hit himself in the head, for giving the lamp to the stooges.

Cast

Credited
 Moe Howard as Moe
 Larry Fine as Larry
 Shemp Howard as Shemp
 Vernon Dent as Mr. Bradley
 Philip Van Zandt as Ahmed
 Dick Curtis as Hassan
 Wesley Bly as Amos, the "Genius" of the Lamp

Uncredited
 Lillian Molieri as harem girl 
 Unknown actress as 2nd harem girl (uncredited)
 Unknown actress as 3rd harem girl

Production notes
Three Arabian Nuts was filmed on January 9–12, 1950, nearly one year prior to its January 1951 release. This is the fifteenth of sixteen Stooge shorts with the word "three" in the title. The film's title is a parody of Arabian Nights, a collection of West and South Asian stories and folk tales compiled in Arabic during the Islamic Golden Age.

References

External links
 
 

1951 films
1951 comedy films
The Three Stooges films
Films directed by Edward Bernds
American black-and-white films
Columbia Pictures short films
American comedy short films
1950s English-language films
1950s American films